Vincenzo Carafa (died 1679) was a Roman Catholic prelate who served as Bishop of Calvi Risorta (1661–1679).

Biography
On 8 August 1661, Vincenzo Carafa was appointed by Pope Alexander VII as Bishop of Calvi Risorta.
He served as Bishop of Calvi Risorta until his death in 1679.

See also
Catholic Church in Italy

References

External links and additional sources

Bishops appointed by Pope Alexander VII
17th-century Italian Roman Catholic bishops
1679 deaths
Year of birth unknown